Michael Reisch (born 1964) is a German artist and photographer. Reisch exhibited nationally and internationally. His works are included in collections worldwide, including the Los Angeles County Museum of Art, USA and National Gallery of Scotland Edinburgh, Scotland. His works combine aspects of documentary photography, painting and sculpture. He lives in Düsseldorf.

Early life and education
Reisch was born in Aachen. He studied at "Stadsacademie voor toegepaste Kunsten" Maastricht in 1985 and at Gerrit Rietveld Academie, Amsterdam 1986 – 91. 1991 he was enrolled in postgraduate studies at Kunstakademie Düsseldorf with Bernd Becher.

Career 

In 1990 Reisch was Artist in Residence at the Foundation Cartier in Paris. He created a series of works, "architectures", between 1991 and 2004, which depict mainly architecture of the 1970s. In 2002 he received a scholarship from the Foundation Kunst und Kultur des Landes Nordrheinwestfalen. Between 2002 and 2006, Reisch worked on a body of work titled "landscapes". His second group of works, "new landscapes", were created from 2007 to 2010, after he received a scholarship from Stiftung Kunstfonds in Bonn. Since 2010 Reisch has combined fully digitally generated abstract works with landscape photography in his exhibitions.

Reisch's works are large-sized photographs, often highly processed by digital editing techniques. He uses these techniques to erase civilizing signs and marks from the buildings photographed.

Solo exhibitions (extract) 

 2001: Räume für neue Kunst, Rolf Hengesbach, Wuppertal
 2005: Galerie Rolf Hengesbach, Köln
 2006: Fotomuseum im Stadtmuseum, München
 2007: Scottish National Portrait Gallery, Edinburgh, Scotland
 2007: Städtische Galerie Wolfsburg
 2007: Landesgalerie am Landesmuseum Oberösterreich, Linz, Österreich
 2008: Kunsthalle Erfurt
 2010: Galerie Hengesbach, Berlin
 2011: Bischoff/Weiss Gallery, London, GB
 2012: Peter Lav Gallery, Kopenhagen, Denmark

Group exhibitions (extract) 
 1996: … wie gemalt, Neuer Aachener Kunstverein
 2002: Zwischen Konstruktion und Wirklichkeit, Landschaft in der zeitgenössischen deutschen Fotografie, Suermondt-Ludwig-Museum, Aachen
 2003: Modellierte Wirklichkeiten, Landesgalerie am Landesmuseum Oberösterreich Linz, Österreich
 2004: Gezähmte Natur, Brandenburgische Kunstsammlungen, Cottbus
 2008: Architecture-Biennale Venice, Italien, with brandlhuber+
 2009: Landscape, contemporary, Dr. Robert-Gerlich-Museum, Burghausen
 2010: Realismus – Das Abenteuer der Wirklichkeit, Kunsthalle der Hypo-Kulturstiftung, Munich, Germany; Kunsthalle Emden; Kunsthal Rotterdam, Niederlande
 2011: Alpenlandschaft-Sehnsuchtsort und Bühne, Residenzgalerie, Salzburg, Österreich
 2011: Section "Romantic Camera", Permanent Collection, National Portrait Gallery, Edinburgh, Scotland
 2011: Shifting Realities, Scheublein Fine Art, Zürich, Schweiz
 2012: Unbestimmtheitstellen, Kunstraum Alexander Bürkle, Freiburg
 2013: Romantic Camera, Edinburgh

Publications (extract) 
 2006: Michael Reisch, monograph, 124 pages, Hatje Cantz Publishers, Ostfildern, Germany, 
 2010: New Landscapes, monograph, 100 pages, Hatje Cantz Publishers, Ostfildern, Germany, 
 2013: Selected Works, monograph, 96 pages, Kerber Publishers, Bielefeld, Germany,

References 

 Langer, Freddy: Materie pur; in: Frankfurter Allgemeine Zeitung (FAZ), No. 28, 3 February 2011.
 Exhibition "Scottish Photography and the modern World" http://www.nationalgalleries.org/whatson/368/romantic-camera/scottish-photography-and-the-modern-world

Literature 

Wolf Lieser: Digital Art, hard-back: 287 pages, Publisher: h.f.ullmann publishing (20 March 2009),

External links 

 http://www.michaelreisch.com/
 Biographie Michael Reisch:http://www.artnet.de/Künstler/michael-reisch/biografie-links
 www.hengesbach-gallery.com/sites/artists/reisch.html
 http://www.bischoffweiss.com/artists/_15/
 http://plgallery.dk/?artists=michael-reisch
 http://scheubleinbak.com/artists/michael-reisch
 http://kunstraum-alexander-buerkle.de/de/sammlung/michael-reisch/
 Exhibition Michael Reisch Museum Kurhaus Kleve: http://www.museumkurhaus.de/de/7808.html

1964 births
Living people
Photographers from North Rhine-Westphalia
People from Aachen
Kunstakademie Düsseldorf alumni
Gerrit Rietveld Academie alumni